Hossein Tabib is an Iranian dentist and pan-Iranist politician who served as a member of parliament from 1975 to 1979, having previously held office as the mayor of Bushehr.

A graduate of University of Tehran, Tabib owned a private dentistry clinic in his native Bushehr, from 1960 to 1975. He also headed the city's Red Lion and Sun Society between 1957 and 1962.

He resigned from Resurgence Party in June 1978.

References 

1927 births
Possibly living people
People from Bushehr
Iranian dentists
Pan-Iranist Party politicians
Rastakhiz Party politicians
Members of the 24th Iranian Majlis
Mayors of places in Iran